Jan Kamp (12 December 1862 - 25 July 1924) - a Dutch immigrant to South Africa, was a journalist in the Netherlands and South Africa. He was a teacher at various schools and later a university professor in literature. In his later years he became a writer and a promoter of the Afrikaans language (especially in high schools).

Roots
Kamp was born on 12 December 1862 in Enschede, The Netherlands and was the son of Hermen Kamp and Gezina Luijerink. He received training as a teacher and later he studied at the Rijksunivesitet in Utrecht, Netherlands. He married a Dutch immigrant Margaretha Maria Elizabeth Herman and they had four children.

Journalist
While still in the Netherlands he was one of the editors of the newspaper De Standaard”(Dutch) (Translated: The Standard). In the later years as lecturer he was editor of : Het Westen(Dutch)(Translated: The West), Ons Vaderland (Afrikaans)(Translated: Our Homeland) (1915). and Het Volk(Dutch)(Translated: The nation). All of these were newspapers circulated locally.

Teaching
He taught in South Africa at schools in Pretoria, Rustenburg and Nigel. While he was a lecturer later years he always stayed involved in Schools.
He was on the committee that lead to the start of Potchefstroom Gimnasium, an Afrikaans High School in Potchefstroom in 1907.

Lecturer
In 1905 he started at the Theologian  Centre of the Reformed  Church in Potchefstroom. In 1912 he became a Professor there and remained it until his death in Potchefstroom  on 25 July 1924. He subject was literature.

Writer
1909- Proeve van inleiding tot de Nederlandse letterkunde
1912- De nieuwe richting in de Nederlandse letterkunde
1912- De school hoort aan de ouders

Afrikaans language
As lecturer he evaluated Afrikaans poems and stories and helped young students to better their Afrikaans.
When on the committee for Potchefstroom Gimnasium he also was in favour of it becoming an Afrikaans medium School.

References 

1862 births
1924 deaths
South African journalists
Academic staff of North-West University
South African writers